Toros de Camagüey (English: Camagüey Bulls) is a baseball team in the Cuban National Series. Formed after the Cuban state redefined its provinces in 1977, the Toros advanced the next season to the league championship series, but fell to Henequeneros. They last won group C in 1997-1998.

History
The team was established in 1977, but there was another team playing in the Camagüey Province nicknamed the Granjeros (Farmers), who started playing in 1967 and can be considered the Toros predecessor.

Young Camagüey pitcher Vicyohandri Odelín and first baseman/center fielder Leslie Anderson played for Cuba at the 2006 World Baseball Classic.

Roster

Notable players

Olympic players
The following players have represented Cuba at the Summer Olympic Games whilst playing for Camagüey:

Elier Sánchez (2008)
Vicyohandri Odelín (2008)

World Baseball Classic players
The following players have represented Cuba at the World Baseball Classic whilst playing for Camagüey:

Leslie Anderson (2006, 2009)
Vicyohandri Odelín (2006)
Wilber Pérez (2013)
Alexander Ayala (2017)
Erly Casanova (2017)

References

Baseball teams in Cuba
Camagüey